Paletta is a surname  of Italian origin, thought to have been derived from the Italian word pall, meaning "cannon ball." There are many different spellings, including Palotta, Pallotta, Pallone, and Palloti.

The first known usage of the name was in Rome, where the "Palloti di Roma" were located.

Families with variants of this surname are located in Rome, Piedmont,  Milan,  Scanno, Abruzzo, and Bologna.

Notable people
 Gabriel Paletta
 Harry Paletta
 Joseph Paletta, Jr.
 Juan Paletta
 Gabriella Pallotta
 Giovanni Battista Maria Pallotta
 Guglielmo Pallotta
 Leonida Pallotta
 Tommy Pallotta
 Vincent Pallotti

References

Surnames of Italian origin
Italian-language surnames